Sandi is a village in Lalganj block of Rae Bareli district, Uttar Pradesh, India. It is located 10 km from Lalganj, the block and tehsil headquarters. As of 2011, it has a population of 228 people, in 39 households. It has one schools and no healthcare facilities.

The 1961 census recorded Sandi as comprising 1 hamlet, with a total population of 116 people (57 male and 59 female), in 30 households and 23 physical houses. The area of the village was given as 125 acres and it had a medical practitioner at that point.

The 1981 census recorded Sandi as having a population of 145 people, in 20 households, and having an area of 50.58 hectares. The main staple foods were listed as wheat and rice.

References

Villages in Raebareli district